A gate is an area in an airport terminal that controls access to a passenger aircraft. While the exact specifications vary from airport to airport and country to country, most gates consist of a seated waiting area, a counter and a doorway leading to the aircraft. A gate adjacent to the stand where the aircraft is parked may be a contact gate, providing access by way of a jet bridge, or a ground-loaded gate, providing a path for passengers to leave the building to board via mobile stairs or airstairs built into the aircraft itself. A remote gate serves an aircraft stand further away, providing access to ground transportation to move passengers between the gate and the stand, where they board via stairs.

Each gate typically corresponds to one parking stand on the airport's apron. A gate that provides access to multiple stands may have separate, designated doorways – sometimes termed sub-gates – for each stand. Commercial airport stands have airside components to facilitate passenger boarding and aircraft ground handling.

While the term gate precisely refers only to the point of access for passengers, and the area where the aircraft itself is parked is precisely termed an aircraft stand, in commercial passenger aviation the term gate is also used to refer to the gate and aircraft stand together as a single area.

Customs and immigration controls

United States
At most domestic gates, a single doorway connects the passenger waiting area with the jet bridge.  International gates at U.S. international airports always have a second doorway to a separate corridor system that leads directly to the airport's U.S. Customs and Border Protection port of entry facility.  For international arrivals from airports without preclearance, the door leading to the waiting area is closed and all arriving passengers are directed through the second doorway to CBP immigration and customs inspection.

Jet bridge vs airstair
Before the era of the jet bridge or jetway, airline passengers embarked onto the aircraft from ground level via airstairs. If initially indoors, passengers would exit the waiting area through a door to the outside and then passengers would proceed to the airstairs leading to the aircraft door. This method is still used for boarding smaller planes or boarding at smaller airports.

Ownership
The equipment is either airport or airline property, in most cases airport infrastructure.

Gallery

References

Types of gates
Airport infrastructure